The BBC Night Network (sometimes referred to on-air as BBC North FM and originally Radio North East) was an all-evening radio network which linked up the North East England, Yorkshire and the Humber, and later the North West England regions of BBC Local Radio. Each station would share the same programming.

Pre-history
From August 1986 to the launch of the Night Network, the four Yorkshire stations (Leeds, York, Sheffield and Humberside) simulcast specialist music programmes on weeknights from 6pm to 7:30pm, extending a year later to six days a week (Wednesday to Monday) between 7pm and 9pm with Tuesday nights reserved for local sports coverage.

History
The BBC Night Network was launched in May 1989 in the then BBC North and BBC North East regions – broadcast nightly on Radio Newcastle, Radio Cleveland, Radio York, Radio Leeds, Radio Humberside and Radio Sheffield between 6:05pm (6pm at the weekend) and midnight. Any local programming broadcast after 6pm, such as weeknight sport and ethnic minority output, was transmitted only on that station's medium-wave frequencies with Night Network output broadcasting on FM. Weeknight programming consisted of two three-hour shows, the second of which was presented by Martin Kelner. The programme included comedy sketches from Caroline Aherne in which she portrayed the Mrs Merton character and partook in ad-libbed conversations with Kelner. Weekend programming consisted of specialist music shows.

The network was expanded in May 1991 to include the four BBC North West stations – BBC GMR (now Radio Manchester), Radio Merseyside, Radio Lancashire and Radio Cumbria. These stations had previously run their own Network North West simulcast service since the start of 1989. The Night Network now broadcast from 7:05pm until midnight. Programming was overhauled with specialist music programmes airing from 7:05pm to 10pm (the exception being made for midweek sports coverage) followed, on weeknights, by a late show from Lancaster, presented by Bob Roberts. The late show was extended to 12:30am a year later and eventually to 1am. Local programming would now fully opt-out of the network with any local evening programming replacing the scheduled Night Network programme on both FM and AM.

Following Bob Roberts' departure, the 10pm1am slot was taken over by a talk show called Late Night North, presented initially by Mike Parr from the Newcastle studios, followed in 1997 by David Dunning and latterly by Alex Trelinski. The programme, developed by Radio Newcastle editor Tony Fish, included a mix of interviews and phone-ins and occasionally broadcast from other BBC Local Radio stations. The show later moved to Manchester and took on a more music-reliant format when it was introduced by Andy Peebles. In 2002, Yorkshire stations left the network to introduce a regional phone-in show with Alex Hall, who had hosted a similar show on Pulse.

News
Initially, a single news update was broadcast across the entire network on the hour. However, regional bulletins were introduced when the north west stations joined the Night Network. Three separate bulletins were broadcast, lasting exactly five minutes, each weeknight - one for Yorkshire and Humberside, one for the North East and Cumbria and one for the North West. Charles Lees read the news in the Yorkshire and Lincolnshire area (BBC North) and Sharon Barbour read the news for the North East and Cumbria.

Jingles
BBC Night Network's jingles were produced by TM Century, now TM Studios. The original package was just for the Yorkshire and the North-East while a second package was produced for the rest of the network.

Current simulcast arrangements
Since the Night Network arrangement was abandoned, the stations involved have taken steps to produce more locally produced programming and in some cases, extend broadcasting hours.

BBC Yorkshire: Radio Leeds, Radio York and Radio Sheffield simulcast late-night shows every night. Radio York also carries some programming from the BBC North East and Cumbria region.
BBC Yorkshire and Lincolnshire: Both Radio Humberside and Radio Lincolnshire carry regional output from BBC Yorkshire. Radio Lincolnshire also carries some weekend programming from the neighbouring BBC East Midlands and BBC East regions.
BBC North East and Cumbria: Radio Newcastle and BBC Tees simulcast late night and weekend evening output with Radio Cumbria and BBC Tees also simulcasting Braithwaite's Country on Sunday evenings.
BBC North West: Indus is broadcast on Radio Manchester and Radio Lancashire on Sunday evenings and both stations broadcast the Allan Beswick phone-in from 10pm-1am each Monday to Thursday night from MediaCityUK in Salford Quays.

Notable presenters
 Alison Butterworth
Bob Preedy
Alex Hall
Martin Kelner

See also
 The Superstation – former night time service on most UK commercial radio stations
 Night Network – night time service by ITV network

External links
 transdiffusion.org – Details of Newcastle studios.
 northeastradio.co.uk – Details of Nicky Brown's involvement.

Defunct BBC Local Radio stations
Radio stations in England
Former British radio networks
Radio stations established in 1989